Nikhom Phatthana is a subdistrict (tambon) of Mueang Lampang District, in Lampang Province, Thailand. As of 2010 it has a population of 5081 people.

History
The subdistrict was formed on 30 September 1992 by the separation of 13 villages from Thung Fai Subdistrict.

Administration
Since 1997 the subdistrict has a Tambon administrative organization (TAO) as its local government.

The tambon is divided into 14 administrative villages (mubans).

References

External links
ThaiTambon.com on Nikhon Phatthana
Website of TAO Nikhon Phatthana

Tambon of Lampang province
Populated places in Lampang province